In Australian Aboriginal religion and mythology, Mar'rallang was the name shared by twin sisters. They both married the same man.

Legendary Australian people